Kristian Jaak Peterson (Riga – , Riga) also known as Christian Jacob Petersohn, was an Estonian poet, commonly regarded as a herald of Estonian national literature and the founder of modern Estonian poetry. He died of tuberculosis aged 21.

His birthday is celebrated in Estonia as Mother Tongue Day.

Biography and work
He was born on 14 March 1801 in Riga. Best known as an Estonian poet, he is commonly regarded as a herald of Estonian national literature and the founder of modern Estonian poetry. His literary career was cut short by the tuberculosis that killed him at the age of 21.

 Cannot the tongue of this land,
 In the wind of incantation,
 Rising up to the heavens,
 Seek eternity?
Kristian Jaak Peterson

Those lines have been interpreted as a claim to reestablish the birthright of the Estonian language. After the University of Tartu was reopened in 1802, but with lectures given in German only, Kristian Jaak Peterson became the first university student to acknowledge his Estonian origin, contributing to the Estonian National Awakening.

Kristian Jaak Peterson gathered his Estonian poems into two small books but never saw them published, as this only occurred a hundred years after his death. Three German poems were published posthumously in 1823. One of Peterson's projects was fulfilled in his lifetime, the German version of Kristfrid Ganander's Mythologia Fennica, a dictionary of Finnish mythological words and names (the Swedish language original was published in 1789). Peterson's translation of Ganander's dictionary found many readers in Estonia and abroad, becoming an important source of national ideology and inspiration for early Estonian literature. Its dominating influence extended through the first decades of the 20th century.

By nature, Peterson imitated the lifestyle of the  Greek cynics and dressed extravagantly, including elements of Estonian traditional clothing (a characteristic long black coat) in his dress. Being exceptionally talented in linguistic subjects, he quickly obtained knowledge of several languages, both ancient and modern, wrote philological treatises and made an attempt to compose a Swedish grammar. In modern days, Peterson's linguistic manuscripts, together with the original versions of his poems and diary, were published in 2001 in an Estonian-German bilingual edition, which included some new translations.

References

1801 births
1822 deaths
Writers from Riga
Riga State Gymnasium No.1 alumni
19th-century deaths from tuberculosis
19th-century Estonian poets
Estonian male poets
19th-century male writers
Tuberculosis deaths in Latvia
19th-century Latvian writers